Singtam Tea Garden (also spelled Singtom) is a census town  in the Darjeeling Pulbazar CD block in the Darjeeling Sadar subdivision of the Darjeeling district in the state of West Bengal, India.

Geography

Location                                                   

Area overview
The map alongside shows the northern portion of the Darjeeling Himalayan hill region. In Darjeeling Sadar subdivision 61% of the total population lives in the rural areas and 39% of the population lives in the urban areas. There are 78 tea gardens/ estates (the figure varies slightly according to different sources), producing and largely exporting Darjeeling tea in the district. It engages a large proportion of the population directly/ indirectly. Some tea gardens were identified in the 2011 census as census towns or villages. Such places are marked in the map as CT (census town) or R (rural/ urban centre). Specific tea estate pages are marked TE.

Note: The map alongside presents some of the notable locations in the subdivision. All places marked in the map are linked in the larger full screen map.

Demographics
According to the 2011 Census of India, Singtam Tea Garden had a total population of 5,792 of which 2,850 (49%) were males and 2,942 (51%) were females. There were 416 persons in the age range of 0 to 6 years. The total number of literate people in Singtam Tea Garden was 4,649 (80.27% of the population over 6 years).

Infrastructure
According to the District Census Handbook 2011, Darjiling, Singtam Tea Garden covered an area of 5.9975 km2. Among the civic amenities, the protected water supply involved overhead tank and tap water from untreated sources. It had 1,182 domestic electric connections. Among the medical facilities it had 1 dispensary/ health centre. Among the educational facilities it had were 5 primary schools, 1 middle school, the nearest secondary and senior secondary school at Darjeeling 10 km away. It had 4 non-formal education centres (Sarba Siksha Abhiyan). Among the social, cultural and recreational facilities, it had 1 auditorium/ community hall. An important commodity it manufactured was tea.

Singtam Tea Estate
Singtam Tea Estate, 6 km from Darjeeling, was established in 1852. It covers 263 hectares. It belongs to the Camelia Tea Group Private Limited. According to another source, Singtam Tea Estate was set up in 1854 by a German priest, Joachim Stoelke. He also planted Darjeeling's oldest tea estate in 1852, at a nearby site called Steinthal.

Tourism
Singtom Tea Estate & Resort, located inside Singtom Tea Estate/Garden, is claimed to the world's oldest tea-estate resort, built in 1854. It is one of the world's most famous plantation-centric boutique hotels. It hosts thousands of visitors each year, and is arguably the only such place in the world where you can get a luxury experience at an affordable price.

References

Cities and towns in Darjeeling district